Wolfe Tones GAA is a Gaelic Athletic Association club which comprises an amalgamation of the parishes of Oristown and Kilberry which are situated roughly halfway between the town of Navan and the town of Kells, in County Meath, Ireland. The club mainly plays football but also have a strong hurling side. It competes in Meath GAA competitions. The club won the Meath Senior Football Championship in 2006 and 2021.

Wolfe Tones went from the Meath Junior Football Championship to Meath Senior Football Championship winners in the space of four seasons in the early 21st-century, featuring Meath player Cian Ward, whose emergence as one of Meath's "most exciting talents" coincided with this run, while 1996 All-Ireland Senior Football Championship-winning captain Tommy Dowd also joined the club around this time.

Notable players
Tommy Dowd
Cian Ward

Honours
Meath Senior Football Championship: 2
2006, 2021
Meath Intermediate Hurling Championship: 3
1992, 2002, 2020
Meath Intermediate Football Championship: 1
2004
Meath Junior Hurling Championship: 2
1989, 2010
 Leinster Special Junior Hurling Championship: 0
 Runner-Up 2010
Meath Junior Football Championship: 1
2003
Leinster Junior Club Football Championship: 1
2003
Meath Junior 2 Hurling Championship: 1
1985
Meath Junior B Football Championship: 2
2007, 2015

References

External links

Gaelic games clubs in County Meath